In mathematics, the Whitney inequality gives an upper bound for the error of best approximation of a function by polynomials in terms of the moduli of smoothness. It was first proved by Hassler Whitney in 1957, and is an important tool in the field of approximation theory for obtaining upper estimates on the errors of best approximation.

Statement of the theorem

Denote the value of the best uniform approximation of a function  by algebraic polynomials  of degree  by

 

The moduli of smoothness of order  of a function  are defined as:

 

 

where  is the finite difference of order .

Theorem:  [Whitney, 1957] If , then

 

The theorem is particularly useful when applied on intervals of small length, leading to good estimates on the error of spline approximation.

Proof
The original proof given by Whitney follows an analytic argument which utilizes the properties of moduli of smoothness. However, it can also be proved in a much shorter way using Peetre's K-functionals.

Let:

 

 

 

Then:

 

 

Therefore:

 

And since we have , (a property of moduli of smoothness)

  

Since  can always be chosen in such a way that , this completes the proof.

Whitney constants and Sendov's conjecture

It is important to have sharp estimates of the Whitney constants. It is easily shown that , and it was first proved by Burkill (1952) that , who conjectured that  for all . Whitney was also able to prove that 

  

and

 

In 1964, Brudnyi was able to obtain the estimate , and in 1982, Sendov proved that . Then, in 1985, Ivanov and Takev proved that , and Binev proved that . Sendov conjectured that  for all , and in 1985 was able to prove that the Whitney constants are bounded above by an absolute constant, that is,  for all .

References

Approximation theory
Numerical analysis
Articles containing proofs